Alan Timothy Hardy (born May 25, 1957) is a retired professional basketball shooting guard who played two seasons in the National Basketball Association (NBA) as a member of the Los Angeles Lakers (1980–81) and the Detroit Pistons (1981–82). He attended the University of Michigan.

External links

1957 births
Living people
American expatriate basketball people in Italy
American men's basketball players
Basketball players from Detroit
Detroit Pistons players
Detroit Spirits players
Las Vegas Silvers players
Los Angeles Lakers players
Michigan Wolverines men's basketball players
Shooting guards
Undrafted National Basketball Association players